Larry Robinson (born October 3, 1949) is an American politician who served as a member of the North Dakota Senate for the 24th district from 1989 to 2020 He is a member of the North Dakota Democratic–Nonpartisan League Party.

References

Living people
1949 births
Democratic Party North Dakota state senators
Politicians from Bismarck, North Dakota
21st-century American politicians